Royce Chan Leong-sze (born 16 September 1978) is a former Hong Kong rugby union player. She has represented Hong Kong internationally in rugby fifteens and sevens. She competed at the 2017 Women's Rugby World Cup in Ireland.

Biography 
Chan retired after the 2017 World Cup, she currently works as a women's high performance coach at the Hong Kong Rugby Union. She captained the Hong Kong women's sevens team at the 2014 Hong Kong Women's Sevens. It was her ninth Hong Kong Women's Sevens appearance. She made her tenth appearance in the tournament in 2015.

In 2019 she was nominated for the Women's Sports Leadership Academy for High Performance Coaches (WSLA). It was a programme partnered by World Rugby and the International Olympic Committee.

References 

Living people
Hong Kong people
Hong Kong rugby union players
Hong Kong female rugby union players
Hong Kong female rugby sevens players
Rugby union players at the 2010 Asian Games
Rugby union players at the 2014 Asian Games
1978 births